This is a list of newspapers in Ivory Coast.

List of newspapers

See also
 List of newspapers in Ivory Coast (in French)
 Media of Ivory Coast
 List of radio stations in Africa: Côte d'Ivoire (fr)
 Press in Abidjan
 Telecommunications in Ivory Coast

References

Bibliography

External links
 
 

Newspapers
 
Ivory Coast